CTV Comedy Channel (often shortened to CTV Comedy and formerly known as The Comedy Network) is a Canadian English-language discretionary specialty channel owned by Bell Media which focuses primarily on comedy programming. The channel first launched on October 17, 1997, and operates two time-shifted feeds, running on Eastern and Pacific Time Zone schedules.

History
In September 1996, 1155636 Ontario Inc. (a company majority controlled by Baton Broadcasting, with the remaining interests held by Shaw Cable, Astral Broadcasting, and Les Films Rozon inc.) was granted a television broadcasting licence by the Canadian Radio-television and Telecommunications Commission (CRTC) for The Comedy Network. The channel launched on October 17, 1997 as The Comedy Network. The network used the slogan "Time well wasted", a parody of the slogan of U.S. channel A&E's at the time, "Time well spent".

Through various acquisitions over the years, Shaw, Astral and Les Films Rozon sold their interest in the service to Baton, which became Bell Globemedia in 2001, renamed CTVglobemedia in 2007. BCE gained control of The Comedy Network on April 1, 2011, through its takeover of CTVglobemedia, in effective changing the company's name to Bell Media. On November 1, 2011, The Comedy Network was relaunched with a new look, consisting a new simplified logo and revamped on-air presentation. Their longtime slogan was also retired on this date.

On July 12, 2012, The Comedy Network launched a high-definition simulcast feed available through all major TV providers.

In August 2013, the CRTC denied an amendment to The Comedy Network's license, which would have reduced the amount of Canadian-produced content the network would have been required to air monthly, increase the amount of animated programming it could air from 10% of its lineup per day to 20% per month, and allow it to air films that were not Canadian-made. Bell argued that the network was at a disadvantage against BiteTV and Teletoon, because Comedy was unable to give its animated acquisitions a larger amount of exposure (such as marathons) due to the restriction. The CRTC rejected its arguments in response to complaints by the two networks cited and other unions, due to their differing natures of service and because Bell's proposed changes were intended primarily to decrease the amount of Canadian content it airs in favour of more U.S.-originated programming. Subsequently, a number of acquired Comedy Network programs were moved to its sister channel Much in the fall of 2013.

Further changes to The Comedy Network's schedule occurred in the 2017–18 season, with the network aligning its primetime lineup with reruns of sitcoms (such as Friends) to target a wider range of viewers (including women), and provide a stronger lead-in to its first-run programs later in the night.

On June 7, 2018, during the CTV upfronts, it was announced that The Comedy Network would eventually rebrand as "CTV Comedy", as part of a realignment of several Bell Media channels under the CTV name. On June 8, 2019, it was revealed The Comedy Network would relaunch as CTV Comedy Channel on September 12, 2019.

Programming

CTV Comedy Channel primarily airs sitcoms and stand-up comedy programming (including anthologies and specials), with much of the latter coming from the channel's association with the Montreal-based Just for Laughs comedy festival. The network also produces its own original programming, with several series (such as Puppets Who Kill, Odd Job Jack and Kevin Spencer) developing cult followings and loyal fan-bases. Puppets Who Kill, Comedy Now!, The Gavin Crawford Show, and several other Comedy original series have gone on to win Canadian Comedy Awards, including CTV's Corner Gas, which has also won six Gemini Award wins, seven Leo Award wins, and an International Emmy nomination. The channel subsequently produced a continuation of Corner Gas as an adult animation series, Corner Gas Animated.

The network has historically had a relationship with Paramount Global-owned Comedy Central in the U.S. In June 2007, Comedy's parent company (then known as CTVglobemedia) announced a deal for exclusive Canadian rights to the entire Comedy Central library of past and present programs on all electronic platforms, under a multi-year agreement with Viacom. For several years, Canadians attempting to visit Comedy Central websites were redirected to the Comedy Network's website. Conversely, American IP addresses trying to link to the Comedy Network page were redirected to Comedy Central's page.

Related services

Comedy Gold

On August 2, 2010, TV Land Canada was rebranded as Comedy Gold, turning the channel into an offshoot of The Comedy Network. Comedy Gold originally focused primarily on sitcoms from the 1970s, 1980s, and 1990s. On July 24, 2019, a representative of Bell Support revealed that Comedy Gold would be shutting down anywhere between August 30 and September 1; it did so on the latter date. Prior to Comedy Gold's shuttering, on August 28, 2019, Wow Unlimited Media revealed that they would have completed their acquisition of Comedy Gold's broadcast license on August 30, 2019.

Comedy Go
As part of Bell Media's suite of Go apps for all its main channels, the Comedy Network launched its own app on April 15, 2014. As part of the launch, the video section on the Comedy Network website was renamed after the app.

Comedy Go was subsumed into the main CTV app in July 2020.

References

External links
 

Analog cable television networks in Canada
Bell Media networks
CTV Television Network
Canadian comedy
Television channels and stations established in 1997
Comedy television networks
English-language television stations in Canada
1997 establishments in Canada
Former Corus Entertainment subsidiaries
Former Corus Entertainment networks